Through These Eyes is the debut solo album by Bryan Josh of Mostly Autumn fame. He plays all the instruments on the album except the drums and flute parts. Gavin Griffiths of Karnataka, Panic Room and Mostly Autumn played most of the drums on the album with Henry Borne, Mostly Autumn drummer during the 2008 shows, playing drums on two of the tracks. The two tracks Borne played on were songs left over from Mostly Autumn's Glass Shadows sessions and they can be heard in instrumental form on the bonus DVD that came with the special edition of Glass Shadows. The album also features Mostly Autumn bandmate Olivia Sparnenn on a few tracks singing lead, harmony and backing vocals.

Track listing
Merry She Goes
Land of the Gods
The Appian Way
We Graze
Black Stone
Slow Down
Through These Eyes
Into Your Arms
Old Friends
Not a Dream
Only in the Loss
Going Home
Carry Me
The Appian Way [Radio Edit]

(All songs written by Bryan Josh)

Produced and engineered by John Spence at Fairview Studio.

Credits
Bryan Josh – lead/backing vocals, lead/rhythm/acoustic guitars, bass guitars, keyboards, tambourine
Olivia Sparnenn – lead/backing vocals
Gavin Griffiths – drums

With:

Henry Bourne – Drums (tracks 5 and 6)
Sarah Dean – Flute (9)

2008 albums